The Yank was a vehicle made by Custom Auto Works, a company based in San Diego, California, in 1950. Being what could be described as a poor man's sports car, it was an inexpensive, though rather attractive, aluminum-bodied car.

References
"Yank", in Ron Kowalke, ed., Standard Catalog of American Cars 1946-1975 (Iola, WI: Krause Publications, 1997), pp. 873.

Sports cars
Cars introduced in 1950